Laura duPont (May 4, 1949 – February 20, 2002) was a female American tennis player.  She was the first woman to win a national title in any sport for the University of North Carolina, as well as being the first female All-American at the school. She was not related to the multiple grand slam winner Margaret Osborne duPont.

Born in Louisville, Kentucky, Laura became acquainted with tennis by practicing on the city's public courts. In her adolescent years, DuPont moved to North Carolina, where she showed promise competing in junior tennis championships.

DuPont attended the University of North Carolina where three times she was named Mid-Atlantic Singles Collegiate Champion. DuPont was singles champion in the years 1968, 1970, and 1971. In 1970, she also secured doubles champion. Aside from her tennis accolades at the school, she also played varsity basketball. In 1970, duPont was named North Carolina AAU Athlete of the Year. In 1972, duPont graduated with a B.A. and joined the tennis inter-national circuit soon after. She won the Canadian (1979), Argentine, New Zealand (singles as well as doubles) and German singles.

DuPont's success continued, becoming the South African doubles champion in 1976, a doubles finalist in 1975 and singles finalist in 1976. She won the U.S. Clay Court Championships singles title in 1977, as well as was a doubles finalist in 1976. In 1984, duPont won the U.S. Open 35 and over singles championship.

From 1975 to 1981, she was on the Women's Tennis Association board, serving in the roles of vice president and treasurer.

Laura duPont was inducted into the North Carolina Tennis Hall of Fame in 1977, the Charlotte Catholic High School Hall of Fame in 2000, the Women's collegiate tennis Hall of fame in 2002 and then North Carolina Sports Hall of Fame in 2018.

After being diagnosed with breast cancer, DuPont moved back to North Carolina in 1997.  She died at Duke University Medical Center in Durham on February 20, 2002.

WTA Tour finals

Doubles 10 (5–5)

References

External links
 
 
 Inventory of the Office of the Women's Tennis Coach of the University of North Carolina at Chapel Hill Records, 1976–1999, in the University Archives, UNC-Chapel Hill.

American female tennis players
North Carolina Tar Heels women's tennis players
Charlotte Catholic High School alumni
Sportspeople from Louisville, Kentucky
Tennis people from Kentucky
Tennis people from North Carolina
1949 births
2002 deaths
20th-century American women
20th-century American people